The Institute for Interreligious Dialogue is a non-governmental organization devoted to dialog among religions throughout the world.

The institute was founded in 1998, by vice president of Mr. Mohammad Khatami, Mohammad Ali Abtahi for promoting Dialogue Among Religions. The academic board of the institute is composed of renowned scholars of Zoroastrianism, Christianity, Islam and Judaism as well as several prominent experts on philosophy of religion, mysticism and Comparative religion.

The institute's library of religions has a collection of more than 4000 titles of professional books of religions in different languages.

Members and officers
Current president of the institute is Mohammad Ali Abtahi, the organizer of Institute and a well-known theologian and former vice president of Iran.

Academic board members: Ali Paya

See also
Religious intellectualism in Iran
Iranian culture
Dariush Shayegan, Iran's pioneering theorist of dialog among cultures
Peace movement

Notes

External links
Official website

Interfaith organizations
Religious organisations based in Iran
Organizations established in 2000
Peace organizations
Islam and other religions